The Avicopter AC313 (also known as the Changhe Z-8F-100) is a civilian helicopter built by Avicopter (AVIC Helicopter Company). It is a development of the earlier Harbin Z-8, itself a locally produced version of the Aerospatiale Super Frelon.

Design and development
The AC313 is an updated design based on the earlier Harbin Z-8, itself a development of the Aérospatiale Super Frelon. The prototype first flew at Jingdezhen, Jiangxi on 18 March 2010. It is designed to carry 18 passengers, has a reported maximum range of 1,050 kilometres, and a maximum takeoff weight of 13 tonnes.

It is equipped with three Pratt & Whitney Canada PT6B-67A engines, the AC313 is a single-rotor helicopter with tail rotors, side-by-side pilot seating, and a non-retractable landing gear. Although based on a 1960s design, the AC313 has been developed to use composite materials for the rotor blade and titanium main rotor. Composite materials are used on 50% of the helicopter and titanium is used for the remainder. The interior comes equipped with a modern integrated digital avionics system and has a cabin height of 1.83 m and 23.5 m3 in space. Designed to carry 27 passengers and two crew in the transport role, it has also been designed to be used for VIP transport, medical evacuations, and for search and rescue operations. In terms of cargo, it can carry up to 4 tonne internally or 5 tonnes on a sling. AC313 is equipped with electronic flight instrument system.

The AC313 is only the second helicopter to be able to operate in the Qinghai-Tibet Plateau, first being Sikorsky S-70C Black Hawk. The flight testing period for the 13-tonne AC313 was conducted in Hulunbuir City, Inner Mongolia, starting in January where it was tested to operate in extremely low temperatures as low as minus 46C marking the scope of  Asia's largest tonnage helicopter meeting the mission requirements of the cold climate and the Earth's polar regions. The helicopter also set its speed record of 336 km per hour during the testing period. The AC313 became the first China-made aircraft authorized by China's civil aviation authority in January to fly in high-altitude regions of over 4,500 meters above the sea level.

The AC313 has recently received a Type Certificate issued by the Civil Aviation Administration of China (CAAC).

Following Chinese certification, the first five AC313 are to be delivered to Flying Dragon Special Aviation, in 2011, but no aircraft have been delivered yet. Avicopter has plans to certify the AC313 for sales in Europe and the United States. Xu Chaoliang, the chief designer of the helicopter, said the company has so far received 32 orders from national and international customers.

Equipped with advanced instrument landing system, the helicopter can be used for disaster relief even in blizzard weather in plateau regions.
 
CAIH, a wholly owned subsidiary of the China Aviation Industry Corp, is expected to produce 300 helicopters annually by 2015, making it one of the major helicopter suppliers in the world. Headquartered in Tianjin, the company is mainly engaged in the research and development, production, maintenance and sales of helicopters and other aircraft and aviation components.

Variants
AC313 Commercial helicopter model derived from Changhe Z-8F.
AC313A Improved AC313 with significant structural redesign, with enlarged internal load area similar to that of Changhe Z-8L. Maiden flight on 17 May 2022.

Specifications

See also

References

2010s Chinese civil utility aircraft
2010s Chinese helicopters
Three-turbine helicopters
Aircraft first flown in 2010